Abdolreza Mesri (born 1956 in Kermanshah) is an Iranian politician. He was elected for the second time as one of Kermanshah's representatives in the ninth Islamic Consultative Assembly on 2 March 2012. Before being elected as an MP, he was serving as Iran's ambassador to Venezuela. He has also served as Iran's Minister of Welfare and Social Security.

References

External links 
 
 

Ambassadors of Iran to Venezuela
Living people
1956 births
Islamic Coalition Party politicians
Popular Front of Islamic Revolution Forces politicians
Members of the 7th Islamic Consultative Assembly
Members of the 9th Islamic Consultative Assembly
Members of the 10th Islamic Consultative Assembly
Islamic Revolutionary Guard Corps officers
Iranian geologists
People from Kermanshah
Government ministers of Iran
Iranian prosecutors